Fibroblast growth factor 6 is a protein that in humans is encoded by the FGF6 gene.

The protein encoded by this gene is a member of the fibroblast growth factor (FGF) family. FGF family members possess broad mitogenic and cell survival activities, and are involved in a variety of biological processes, including embryonic development, cell growth, morphogenesis, tissue repair, tumor growth and invasion. This gene displayed oncogenic transforming activity when transfected into mammalian cells. The mouse homolog of this gene exhibits a restricted expression profile predominantly in the myogenic lineage, which suggested a role in muscle regeneration or differentiation.

References

Further reading